Dany Brand (born 23 February 1996, in Hinwil) is a Swiss athlete specialising in the 400 metres hurdles. He won a silver medal at the 2017 European U23 Championships in a new national U23 record.

His personal best in the event is 49.14 seconds set in Bydgoszcz in 2017.

International competitions

References

External links
Official site

1996 births
Living people
Swiss male hurdlers
People from Hinwil District
Competitors at the 2017 Summer Universiade
Competitors at the 2019 Summer Universiade
Sportspeople from the canton of Zürich